The Marked Tree Lock and Siphons are a flood control facility on the St. Francis River in Poinsett County, Arkansas. Built in 1926, the lock is located on a now disused and partially filled artificial channel west of the main river. The lock gates have been removed and that area filled in and topped by a roadway. The siphons are located on a levee that impounds the main river channel several hundred feet upstream from the lock, and consist of a series large metal tubes, whose ends are mounted in submerged concrete structures above and below the levee. The siphons were built in 1939 to solve the problem of water flow regulation in the wake of repeated major flooding events on the river, and are described by the United States Army Corps of Engineers as unique in the nation for their scope and efficiency.

The lock and siphons were listed on the National Register of Historic Places in 1988.

See also

National Register of Historic Places listings in Poinsett County, Arkansas

References

Infrastructure completed in 1926
Buildings and structures in Poinsett County, Arkansas
Historic districts on the National Register of Historic Places in Arkansas
National Register of Historic Places in Poinsett County, Arkansas